"Only a Lonely Heart Knows" is a song written by Stephen Allen Davis and Dennis Morgan, and recorded by American country music artist Barbara Mandrell.  It was released in May 1984 as the second single from her album Clean Cut.  The song reached number 2 on the Billboard Hot Country Singles chart in September 1984 and number 1 on the RPM Country Tracks chart in Canada.

Charts

Weekly charts

Year-end charts

References

1984 singles
Barbara Mandrell songs
Songs written by Stephen Allen Davis
Songs written by Dennis Morgan (songwriter)
Song recordings produced by Tom Collins (record producer)
MCA Records singles
1984 songs